Paul Steven Haigh (born 5 September 1957) is an Australian convicted serial killer currently serving six sentences of life imprisonment without the possibility of parole for the murder of six people in the late 1970s. He also murdered a fellow inmate in 1991. Haigh has claimed that he suffers from Borderline Personality Disorder and thus deserved a lighter sentence, but this is an unsubstantiated claim. An appeal was rejected on 13 December 2012.

See also
List of serial killers by country

References

1957 births
20th-century Australian criminals
Australian murderers of children
Australian people convicted of murder
Australian prisoners sentenced to multiple life sentences
Australian serial killers
Criminals from Melbourne
Living people
Male serial killers
Murder in Melbourne
People convicted of murder by Victoria (Australia)
Prisoners sentenced to life imprisonment by Victoria (Australia)